Sandeep Kumar Singh is an Indian politician and the current Minister of State for Education in the Government of Uttar Pradesh.He is born into Lodhi Rajput Family

Education- MA in Public Relations and Strategic Communication, Leeds Beckett University United Kingdom.
He is currently Minister Of State (Independent Charge) Basic Education in U.P. Government 

He is born into Lodhi Rajput Family

Political career
Member of Legislative Assembly, 73 Atrauli, Aligarh, Uttar Pradesh

Sandeep Singh got the Department of Basic Education (2022-Present) and Department of Secondary, Higher, Technical, Medical education (2017-2022).

See also
 Yogi Adityanath ministry (2017–)

References

Bharatiya Janata Party politicians from Uttar Pradesh
Yogi ministry
Politicians from Aligarh
1991 births
Living people
Uttar Pradesh MLAs 2022–2027